North Deer Creek is a  long 2nd order tributary to French Creek in Mercer County, Pennsylvania.

Course
North Deer Creek rises on the Conneaut Outlet divide about 1 mile northeast of Sunol, Pennsylvania in Mercer County.  North Deer Creek then flows easterly to meet French Creek about 1 mile southeast of Carlton, Pennsylvania.

Watershed
North Deer Creek drains  of area, receives about 43.4 in/year of precipitation, has a topographic wetness index of 456.90, and has an average water temperature of 8.23 °C.  The watershed is 54% forested.

See also 
 List of rivers of Pennsylvania
 List of tributaries of the Allegheny River

References

Additional Images

Rivers of Mercer County, Pennsylvania
Rivers of Venango County, Pennsylvania
Rivers of Pennsylvania
Tributaries of the Allegheny River